Anisacantha is a monotypic genus of phasmids belonging to the family Anisacanthidae. The only species is Anisacantha difformis.

References

Phasmatodea
Phasmatodea genera